The United Services Automobile Association (USAA) is an American financial services group of companies including a Texas Department of Insurance-regulated reciprocal inter-insurance exchange and subsidiaries offering banking and insurance to people and families who serve, or served, in the United States Armed Forces. At the end of 2020, it had more than 13 million members.

USAA was founded in 1922 in San Antonio, Texas, by a group of 25 U.S. Army officers as a mechanism for mutual self-insurance when they were unable to secure auto insurance because of the perception that they, as military officers, were a high-risk group. USAA has since expanded to offer banking and insurance services to past and present members of the Armed Forces, officers and enlisted, and their families. The company ranked No. 96th in the 2020 Fortune 500 list of the largest United States corporations by total revenue and appeared on Fortune's 2021 Blue Ribbon list of companies, placing No. 355 on the Fortune Global 500, No. 94 on the Fortune 500, No. 55 on the 100 Best Companies to Work For and World’s Most Admired Companies.

History
The organization was originally called the United States Army Automobile Association. In 1924, the name was changed to United Services Automobile Association, when commissioned officers of other U.S. military services became eligible for membership. The company was formed based on a meeting of twenty-five United States Army Officers on June 20, 1922, at the Gunter Hotel in San Antonio, Texas, to discuss the procurement of reliable and economical auto insurance. Despite initial success, by the late 1920s a dispute between competing factions for control of the company threatened its long term viability. The issue was resolved when feuding members agreed to hire a leader from outside, resulting in the 1928 appointment of Major General Ernest Hinds as general manager and secretary-treasurer.  Hinds provided stability and remained in the position until his 1941 death.

USAA is headquartered in northwest San Antonio, occupying a  former horse farm.

USAA is a pioneer of the concept of direct marketing; most of its business is conducted over the Internet or telephone using employees instead of agents. Until the 1960s, the bulk of its business was conducted via mail. In the late 1960s, USAA began a transition from mail to phone-based sales and service. It launched a toll-free number in 1978, and Internet sales and service in June 1999 via its website.

USAA offered restricted membership to civilians between September 2009 and August 2013. This membership provided access to USAA's investment products, most bank deposit products, and life insurance. Auto and property insurance policies were not included for non-military members due to eligibility restrictions.

In 2015, USAA employed more than 32,000 people at its offices throughout the world.

On July 26, 2019, the Charles Schwab Corporation announced it would acquire USAA's investment management and brokerage accounts for $1.8 billion. The deal with Charles Schwab closed on May 26, 2020.

Lines of business

Property, casualty, and life insurance
USAA offers a range of personal property and casualty (P&C) insurance, including automobile insurance, homeowner insurance, renters' insurance, as well as umbrella and personal property insurance. In addition to P&C insurance, USAA provides whole life insurance, term life insurance, and annuities. USAA's life insurance policies, while not unique in the industry, are different from most offerings since they do not include a war-exclusion clause.

Banking
Banking services can be accessed in person, by mail, by phone, or through the internet. USAA Federal Savings Bank provides members with the ability to deposit checks to their accounts using mobile applications on the Apple iPhone and iPad and mobile devices with Google's Android operating system.

Major banking competitors include Bank of America-Military Bank, Pentagon Federal Credit Union, and Navy Federal Credit Union.

Investing and financial planning
USAA provides Education 529 Plans for its members, but members are referred to its strategic partners, Charles Schwab Corporation and Victory Capital Management for other investment services such as brokerage and trading, mutual funds and ETFs.

Target market
USAA's mission statement indicates its focus to serve its niche market, which consists of members of the U.S. military and their immediate families.  To that end, the association has always marketed directly to members of the U.S. military. USAA membership is offered to officers and enlisted personnel, including those on active duty, those in the National Guard and Reserve, Officer candidates in commissioning programs (Academy, ROTC, OCS/OTS) and all those who have served in the aforementioned categories and who have retired or have been discharged honorably.

Historically, only U.S. military officers (among certain other federally sworn officers) were eligible to join USAA, with descendants of USAA members able to purchase insurance from USAA-CIC. It did not matter if one was an active duty or retired officer; one could join at any time. In 1973, membership was opened to members of the National Guard and Reserves, and in 1996, eligibility was expanded to enlisted members of the armed services. As the number of persons who have served on active duty in an enlisted status in the U.S. Armed Forces is quite large, USAA chose to limit the establishment of eligibility to those who were currently on active duty or who had recently separated. The same time limit on establishment of eligibility was then applied to military officers. In 2008, USAA expanded membership eligibility to all military personnel and retirees, and all veterans who separated after 1996. For a short time, USAA also offered enrollment for federal law enforcement. In November 2009, USAA expanded eligibility requirements to offer coverage to anyone who has ever served honorably in the US Military. As of 2022, USAA has also extended membership to those who have a general under honorable discharge from the military.

Leadership
Led by USAA Chairman of the Board Vice Admiral James M. Zortman (Ret.), USAA's board of directors named Wayne Peacock CEO-elect in January 2020 to succeed former CEO Stuart Parker. Peacock became CEO in February 2020 and is the first USAA CEO who is not veteran of the armed forces.

USAA former CEOs include retired Air Force brigadier general Robert F. McDermott. The USAA office building in San Antonio was constructed under his tenure, and McDermott was behind USAA's shift from service-by-mail to service-by-phone. He was succeeded as CEO by retired Air Force General Robert T. Herres. It was under Herres that USAA expanded its services to enlisted members of the military and developed Internet based financial services. Following General Herres as CEO was Robert G. Davis, a former Army officer who came to USAA with experience in a variety of financial services companies. Davis is said to have changed the culture at USAA; during his time at USAA, membership, assets and net worth grew significantly.

His tenure, however, was not without controversy. Davis oversaw USAA's first layoffs and by some reports had a confrontational style of leadership. Davis had indicated to USAA employees that he intended to continue to lead USAA until 2010, however, he retired in December 2007. The nature of his retirement seems to have been precipitous, as USAA CEO Josue Robles has stated that upon assuming the role of CEO, "I thought I was just going to be a temporary CEO and (the board) said, 'Guess what? The permanent CEO is you'."

Locations

Besides its headquarters in San Antonio, USAA has a second major office in Phoenix. USAA also has offices in Chesapeake, Virginia; Colorado Springs, Colorado; Plano, Texas; and Tampa, Florida. Internationally, USAA has offices in London and Frankfurt.  The company has numerous office buildings in the Phoenix area.  Their largest office buildings are on a 400-acre multi-use north Phoenix campus built in 2017, these buildings contain 4,500 workers. In May 2019 USAA opened another Phoenix office located at 25700 N Norterra Pkwy in north Phoenix that will eventually house 1,100 employees primarily software developers.

On May 27, 2021, USAA announced that it will be adding an additional 750 employees to its 100-employee base in Charlotte, North Carolina. The company will be leasing  of space in a new building in South End called The Square. Company employees started moving in at the end of 2021.  In June 2022, USAA purchased The Square from developer Beacon Partners for $97 million.  Currently the company has 500 employees in the building and they occupy 2 out of the 6 floors they originally agreed to lease of the 10 story building.

See also

 List of largest banks in the United States

References

External links
 

1922 establishments in Texas
American companies established in 1922
auto insurance in the United States
banks based in Texas
banks established in 1983
companies based in San Antonio
financial services companies established in 1922
insurance companies based in Texas
life insurance companies of the United States
online financial services companies of the United States
privately held companies based in Texas